is a Japanese voice actress from Saitama Prefecture. She married voice actor Yoshimitsu Shimoyama in 2008 and had a son in 2010, but her husband's identity was not disclosed until 2016.

Filmography

Anime TV series

Original video animation (OVA)

Original net animation (ONA)

Anime films

Tokusatsu

Video games

Dubbing

Live-action TV series

Live-action films

Animated TV series

Notes

References

External links
  
 Satomi Arai at GamePlaza-Haruka Voice Acting Database 
 Satomi Arai at Hitoshi Doi's Seiyuu Database
 

1980 births
Living people
Japanese video game actresses
Japanese voice actresses
Voice actresses from Saitama Prefecture
21st-century Japanese actresses